The following squads and players competed in the men's handball tournament at the 1996 Summer Olympics.

Algeria
The following players represented Algeria:

 Amar Daoud
 Abdel Ghani Loukil
 Redouane Aouachria
 Salim Nedjel-Hammou
 Nabil Rouabhi
 Redouane Saïdi
 Ben Ali Beghouach
 Sofiane Lamali
 Abdeldjalil Bouanani
 Mahmoud Bouanik
 Rabah Gherbi
 Achour Hasni
 Sofiane Khalfallah
 Mohamed Bouziane
 Salim Abes
 Karim El-Mahouab

Brazil
The following players represented Brazil:

 Cezar Stelzner de Lima
 Edison Alves Freire
 Ivan Raimundo Pinheiro
 Marcos Antônio Cezar
 José Ronaldo do Nascimento
 Fausto Steinwandter
 Paulo Moratore
 Milton Fonseca Pelissari
 Daniel Pinheiro
 Agberto Correa de Matos
 Marcelo Minhoto Ferraz de Sampaio
 Winglitton Rocha Barros
 Ivan Bruno Maziero
 Rodrigo Hoffelder
 Osvaldo Inocente Filho
 Carlos Luciano Ertel

Croatia
The following players represented Croatia:

 Patrik Ćavar
 Valner Franković
 Slavko Goluža
 Bruno Gudelj
 Vladimir Jelčić
 Božidar Jović
 Nenad Kljaić
 Venio Losert
 Valter Matošević
 Zoran Mikulić
 Alvaro Načinović
 Goran Perkovac
 Iztok Puc
 Zlatko Saračević
 Irfan Smajlagić
 Vladimir Šujster

Egypt
The following players represented Egypt:

 Ahmed El-Awady
 Ahmed El-Attar
 Ahmed Ali
 Hosam Abdallah
 Mahmoud Soliman
 Gohar Al-Nil
 Yasser Mahmoud
 Khaled Mahmoud
 Ayman El-Alfy
 Mohamed Bakir El-Nakib
 Amro El-Geioushy
 Ashraf Mabrouk Awaad
 Ayman Abdel Hamid Soliman
 Ahmed Belal
 Saber Hussein
 Sameh Abdel Waress

France
The following players represented France:

 Eric Amalou
 Grégory Anquetil
 Stéphane Cordinier
 Yohan Delattre
 Christian Gaudin
 Stéphane Joulin
 Guéric Kervadec
 Denis Lathoud
 Pascal Mahé
 Bruno Martini
 Gaël Monthurel
 Raoul Prandi
 Jackson Richardson
 Philippe Schaaf
 Stéphane Stoecklin
 Frédéric Volle

Germany
The following players represented Germany:

 Andreas Thiel
 Christian Scheffler
 Christian Schwarzer
 Daniel Stephan
 Holger Löhr
 Jan Fegter
 Jan Holpert
 Karsten Kohlhaas
 Klaus-Dieter Petersen
 Markus Baur
 Martin Schmidt
 Martin Schwalb
 Stefan Kretzschmar
 Thomas Knorr
 Volker Zerbe

Kuwait
The following players represented Kuwait:

 Abbas Al-Harbi
 Abdul Razzaq Al Balushi
 Adel Al-Nahham
 Bandar Al-Shammari
 Ismael Shah Al-Zadah
 Khaldoun Al-Khashti
 Khaled Al-Mulla
 Mishal Al-Ali
 Naser Al-Otaibi
 Qaied Al-Adwani
 Salah Al-Marzouq
 Salem Al-Marzouq

Russia
The following players represented Russia:

 Aleksey Frantsuzov
 Andrey Lavrov
 Dmitry Filippov
 Dmitri Torgovanov
 Igor Lavrov
 Lev Voronin
 Oleg Grebnev
 Oleg Kiselyov
 Oleg Kuleshov
 Pavel Sukosyan
 Sergey Pogorelov
 Valery Gopin
 Vasily Kudinov
 Vyacheslav Gorpishin

Spain
The following players represented Spain:

 Talant Duyshebaev
 Salvador Esquer
 Aitor Etxaburu
 Jesús Fernández
 Jaume Fort
 Mateo Garralda
 Raúl González
 Rafael Guijosa
 Fernando Hernández
 José Javier Hombrados
 Demetrio Lozano
 Jordi Núñez
 Jesús Olalla
 Juan Pérez
 Iñaki Urdangarín
 Alberto Urdiales

Sweden
The following players represented Sweden:

 Magnus Andersson
 Robert Andersson
 Per Carlén
 Martin Frändesjö
 Erik Hajas
 Robert Hedin
 Andreas Larsson
 Ola Lindgren
 Stefan Lövgren
 Mats Olsson
 Staffan Olsson
 Johan Petersson
 Tomas Svensson
 Tomas Sivertsson
 Pierre Thorsson
 Magnus Wislander

Switzerland
The following players represented Switzerland:

 Carlos Lima
 Christian Meisterhans
 Daniel Spengler
 Marc Baumgartner
 Matthias Zumstein
 Nick Christen
 René Barth
 Robbie Kostadinovich
 Rolf Dobler
 Roman Brunner
 Stefan Schärer
 Urs Schärer
 Alex Vasilakis

United States
The following players represented the United States:

 Derek Brown
 Greg Caccia
 David DeGraaf
 Yaro Dachniwsky
 Robert Dunn
 Denny Fercho
 Joe Fitzgerald
 Tom Fitzgerald
 Darrick Heath
 John Keller
 Cliff Mannon
 Steve Penn
 Matt Ryan
 Mark Schmocker
 Michael Thornberry
 Chip Van Os

References

1996